Constandis was a fishing vessel sunk for use as a recreational dive site in Limassol Bay, Cyprus.

Constandis, originally operated as a bottom trawler, was built in the Soviet Union in 1989. Her Russian name was Zolotets. She was registered at the Register of Cyprus Ships in 1997 and operated in international waters in the eastern Mediterranean Sea for a short period of time.

Constandis was sunk off Limassol in February 2014 along with the passenger ship Lady Thetis. There are also some easy penetration options for divers who are more adventurous.

Dive site details
Access: Whilst close to the marina adjacent to the Crowne Plaza Hotel, a vessel is required to complete the transit to the site.
Expected depth: 24.3 m
Bottom characteristics: Sandy/Silty
Max depth in area: <30 m (98 ft)
Alternate site: Three stars/Paphos/Latchi

Particular risks:	
 Traffic protection - High
 Narcosis - Low
 Decompression - Moderate
 Increased air consumption - High
 Limited time - Low 
 Poor visibility - Moderate
 Separation - High
 Entanglement - Moderate
 Entrapment and sharps – High
 Dehydration/Sun burn/Exposure – High
 Penetration - Low

References

Ships built in the Soviet Union
1989 ships
Shipwrecks in the Mediterranean Sea
Ships sunk as dive sites
Maritime incidents in 2014